The National Train Show (or NTS) is held as part of the annual National Convention of the National Model Railroad Association. Held in a different city each year, it consists of railfan and model railroading products, and model train layouts created by clubs.

External links
 National train Show website

Model railway shows and exhibitions